Memories of Berlin: The Twilight of Weimar Culture is a documentary film produced and directed by Gary Conklin, and released in 1976.

The film tells the cultural story of Berlin during the Weimar Republic through interviews with a number of persons who were involved in literature, film, art, and music during the period.  It includes interviews with Christopher Isherwood, Louise Brooks, Lotte Eisner, Elisabeth Bergner, Francis Lederer, Carl Zuckmayer, Gregor Piatigorsky, Claudio Arrau, Rudolf Kolisch, Mischa Spoliansky, Herbert Bayer, Mrs. Walter Gropius, and Arthur Koestler.

External links
 Memories of Berlin at Gary Conklin Films
  Memories of Berlin at the Internet Movie Database

1976 films
Documentary films about historical events
Documentary films about Berlin
1920s in Berlin
1930s in Berlin
Culture in Berlin
Weimar culture